Vancouver Career College is a private for-profit post-secondary career college with seven campuses in British Columbia, Canada. It specializes in training students for careers in health care, business, legal administration, education and various trades. Established in 1996, the college is owned by the Eminata Group via Vancouver Career College (Burnaby) Inc. which does business as three different career colleges: Vancouver Career College, CDI College, and Vancouver College of Art and Design.

Campus locations 
The college has seven locations in British Columbia:
Abbotsford
Burnaby
Chilliwack
Coquitlam
Kelowna
Surrey
Vancouver

Programs 
Vancouver Career College is accredited by the Private Training Institutions Branch (PTIB) of the British Columbia Ministry of Advanced Education, Skills & Training. It offers over 50 PTIB-approved vocational courses, including:
Practical Nursing
Accounting and Payroll Administrator
Construction Electrician Foundation
Health Care Assistant
International Trade
Business Administration/E-Commerce Management

References

External links
 

Universities and colleges in Vancouver
Colleges in British Columbia
For-profit universities and colleges in Canada
Eminata Group